The National Patriotic Reconstruction Assembly Government (NPRAG) was a self-declared, alternative administration established in early 1991 in areas held by the rebel National Patriotic Front of Liberia (NPFL) during the country's civil war. It was formed in opposition to the internationally recognized Interim Government of National Unity (IGNU) led by Amos Sawyer. The NPRAG was based in the Bong County town of Gbarnga. NPFL leader Charles Taylor declared himself head of the NPRAG, but this led to a dispute that eventually split the rebel group. Both the NPRAG and IGNU ceased to exist in 1994.

See also: Liberia

History of Liberia